Samuel is a biblical figure.

Samuel may also refer to:

Samuel (name)
Samuel (novel), an 1886 Armenian novel by Raffi
Samuel (cartoonist) (1925–2012), Kerala cartoonist 
Samuel (singer) (born 2002), full name Samuel Kim Arredondo, South Korean singer
Samuel (musician) (born 1987), American indie musician
Samuel (footballer, born 1974), full name Samuel José da Silva Vieira, Brazilian football centre-back
Samuel (footballer, born 1986), full name Samuel Firmino de Jesus, Brazilian football centre-back
Samuel (footballer, born 1988), full name Samuel Elias do Carmo Soares, Brazilian football defender
Samuel (footballer, born January 1989), full name Samuel de Oliveira Pires, Brazilian football goalkeeper
Samuel (footballer, born July 1989), full name Samuel Henrique Silva Guimaraes, Brazilian football midfielder
Samuel (footballer, born 1991), full name Samuel Rosa Gonçalves, Brazilian football striker
Samuel (footballer, born 1999), full name Samuel Gomes da Mata, Brazilian football forward